Gondouin is a French surname. Notable people with the surname include:

Charles Gondouin (1875–1947), French rugby union player and tug of war competitor
Jacques Gondouin (1737–1818), French architect
Sébastien Gondouin (born 1976), French footballer

See also
Ménil-Gondouin, a commune of Orne, France 

French-language surnames